Xico may refer to: Dung dịch giặt xả gia đình

Places 
 Xico Viet Nam
 Xico Thành Phố HCM, Việt Nam

Other 
 Xico (liquid detergent)
 Xico (restaurant), in Portland, Oregon
 Xico, a Portuguese nickname for Francisco